Two Coins may refer to:

 "Two Coins" (The Unit), an episode of the television series The Unit
 A song by Dispatch
 A song by City and Colour from the 2013 album The Hurry and the Harm